Roger Eugene Eno (born in Woodbridge, England, in 1959) is an English ambient music composer. He is the brother of Brian Eno.

Early life and education
Roger Eno began euphonium lessons when he was 12 years old, and entered Colchester Institute to study music when he was 16. Upon graduating, and after a period of busking in London (where he briefly shared a house with artists Mark Wallinger and Andy Dog), Eno returned to Colchester to run a music therapy course at a local hospital for people with learning difficulties.

Career
In 1983, he had his first recording experience when he recorded the album Apollo with his brother Brian Eno and Canadian producer and musician Daniel Lanois at Lanois' Grant Avenue Studios in Hamilton, Ontario. His first solo album, Voices, was released in 1985.

Although mainly regarded as a pianist, Eno is a multi-instrumentalist and singer, as demonstrated on his later solo albums and collaborations. He has worked with several key artists apart from his brother including Bill Nelson, No-Man, Lol Hammond, Mads Arp, Peter Hammill, Gaudi, Tim Bowness and Michael Brook, the most successful of which was probably his co-written album The Familiar, with Kate St John.

Eno performs live on occasions and writes soundtracks. Much of his music has been used in films, including For All Mankind, Nine and a Half Weeks, Warm Summer Rain and The Jacket, while tracks have been used in advertisements, including for Nissan and for Japan Railways.

Eno has recorded solo albums for, and established an online shop via, the UK-based internet label Burning Shed. In 2007, he contributed to the Mid/Air LP by Dive Index, a collaborative music project of composer/producer Will Thomas.

In 2013 Eno released the album, Endless City / Concrete Garden, under the name Roger Eno / Plumbline, and a collection of Eno's work from 1988 to 1998, Little Things Left Behind.

In 2015, Eno featured playing piano on two tracks ("A Boat Lies Waiting" and "Beauty") on David Gilmour's solo album, Rattle That Lock.

On 10 November 2017, Eno released a solo album, This Floating World, on Recital Records.

On 23 June 2019, he performed at the Dark Mofo in Hobart, Tasmania.

Roger performed for the first time with his brother Brian at the Acropolis on 4 August 2021.

Discography
Apollo (with Brian Eno & Daniel Lanois) (Virgin) – 1983
Voices (EG/Virgin) – 1985
Between Tides (All Saints Records) – 1988
Music for Films III (Opal/Warner Bros. Records) – 1988
Islands (with Laraaji) (Voiceprint Records, La Cooka Ratcha) – 1989
In a Room (with Harmonia Ensemble) – 1993
The Familiar (with Kate St John) (All Saints Records) – 1993
Automatic (as part of Channel Light Vessel) (All Saints Records) – 1994
Harmonia meets Zappa (with Harmonia Ensemble) (Materiali Sonori) – 1994
Lost In Translation (All Saints Records) – 1995
The Night Garden (Voiceprint Records, La Cooka Ratcha) – 1995
Swimming (All Saints Records) – 1996
Excellent Spirits (as part of Channel Light Vessel) (All Saints Records) – 1996
The Music of Neglected English Composers (Voiceprint Records, Resurgence) – 1997
The Flatlands (All Saints Records) – 1998
Damage (with Lol Hammond) (All Saints Records) – 1999
The Appointed Hour (with Peter Hammill) (FIE! Records) – 1999
Classical Music for Those with No Memory (with Garosi, Puliti, Odori) – 2000
The Long Walk (Voiceprint Records, La Cooka Ratcha) – 2000
Getting Warmer (Burning Shed Records) – 2002
18 Keyboard Studies By Hans Friedrich Micheelsen (Opal Records) – 2002
Fragile (Music) (Burning Shed Records) – 2005
At Lincoln Cathedral: Roger Eno (Live) – 2005
Transparencies (with Plumbline) – 2006
Anatomy (Burning Shed Records) – 2008
Flood (Burning Shed Records) – 2008
Lux (Warp) – 2012
Ted Sheldrake (Backwater Records) - 2012
Endless City / Concrete Garden (with Plumbline) – 2013
Rattle That Lock (David Gilmour) – Columbia/SME Records – 2015
This Floating World (Recital Records) – 2017
Dust of Stars (Painted World Music) – 2018
Mixing Colours (with Brian Eno) – (Deutsche Grammophon/Universal Classics) – 2020
The Turning Year – (Deutsche Grammophon/Universal Classics) – 2022

See also
List of ambient music artists

References

External links
 Burning Shed Records

English composers
English buskers
People from Woodbridge, Suffolk
1959 births
Living people
All Saints Records artists
Virgin Records artists
Deutsche Grammophon artists